Abdul Rahim bin Abdul Razak (born 18 January 1995) is Malaysian footballer who plays for Sarawak United in the Malaysia Premier League as an attacking midfielder.

Career statistics

Club

References

External links
 

1995 births
Living people
Malaysian footballers
Sarawak FA players
Sarawak United FC players
Malaysia Super League players
Malaysia Premier League players
Association football midfielders